Jalen Tyrese Johnson (born December 18, 2001) is an American professional basketball player for the Atlanta Hawks of the National Basketball Association (NBA). He played college basketball for the Duke Blue Devils. He was a consensus five-star recruit and one of the best small forwards in the 2020 class. Johnson finished his high school career at Nicolet High School in Glendale, Wisconsin.

High school career
Johnson played his first two years of high school basketball for Sun Prairie High School in Sun Prairie, Wisconsin. He played under former head coach Jeff Boos. As a freshman in 2016–17, Johnson averaged 15.2 points, 6.2 rebounds, 2.1 assists, 1.2 steals, and 1.1 blocks to help his team to a 20–4 record. They were upset in the Regional Finals by Madison East High School. As a sophomore in 2017–18, Johnson averaged 18.4 points, 9.6 rebounds, 4.0 assists, 1.9 steals, and 1.5 blocks to help his team to a 25–2 record. He led the Cardinals to their first state tournament Division 1 semifinals appearance.

After his sophomore year he transferred to Nicolet High School in Glendale, Wisconsin. Johnson helped lead Nicolet to the Division 2 State Championship. He was named the Associated Press Player of the Year for Wisconsin. In 2019, Johnson transferred to IMG Academy in Bradenton, Florida for his senior year. On January 5, 2020, he left IMG Academy, before returning to Nicolet, though not necessarily to play basketball. He was ruled eligible on February 8 to play the remainder of the season for Nicolet after never playing in a game for IMG. As a senior, Johnson averaged 24.6 points, 10.9 rebounds and 4.8 assists in 9 games. He was selected to play in the Jordan Brand Classic, which was canceled due to the COVID-19 pandemic.

Recruiting
Johnson was rated as a five-star recruit and the No.13 overall recruit in the 2020 high school class.

On July 4, 2019, Johnson committed to play college basketball at Duke University over offers from Arizona, Kentucky, and Wisconsin.

College career
The Duke team entered the season in the top 10, and Johnson was its most highly rated player. In his first game, Johnson had 19 points and 19 rebounds against Coppin State. On November 30, 2020, Johnson earned ACC Freshman of the week honors. On January 26, 2021, Johnson scored 18 points and 6 rebounds in a 75–68 win over Georgia Tech. 

On February 15, 2021, Johnson announced that he would forgo the remainder of the Duke season to prepare for the 2021 NBA draft. Leaving in the midst of a college season raised many questions, but Johnson explained that the decision was in the best interest of his family and himself.

During his 13 games as a Blue Devil, Johnson averaged 11.2 points, 6.2 rebounds, and 2.0 assists per game.

Duke season ended its season with 13 wins and 11 losses. They finished 10th in the ACC with a 9-9 record.

Professional career

Atlanta Hawks (2021–present)
On July 29, 2021, Johnson was selected by the Atlanta Hawks with the 20th pick in the 2021 NBA Draft. On August 4, 2021, he signed with the Hawks. Johnson was assigned to the Hawks' NBA G League affiliate, the College Park Skyhawks, for the G League season opener. After the season ended, he underwent a non-surgical left knee procedure.

Career statistics

NBA

Regular season

|-
| style="text-align:left;"| 
| style="text-align:left;"| Atlanta
| 22 || 0 || 5.5 || .537 || .231 || .714 || 1.2 || .1 || .1 || .1 || 2.4
|- class="sortbottom"
| style="text-align:center;" colspan="2"|Career
| 22 || 0 || 5.5 || .537 || .231 || .714 || 1.2 || .1 || .1 || .1 || 2.4

Playoffs

|-
| style="text-align:left;"|2022
| style="text-align:left;"|Atlanta
| 2 || 0 || 4.5 || .000 || .000 || – || .0 || .0 || .0 || .0 || .0
|- class="sortbottom"
| style="text-align:center;" colspan="2"|Career
| 2 || 0 || 4.5 || .000 || .000 || – || .0 || .0 || .0 || .0 || .0

College

|-
| style="text-align:left;"| 2020–21
| style="text-align:left;"| Duke
| 13 || 8 || 21.4 || .523 || .444 || .632 || 6.1 || 2.2 || 1.2 || 1.2 || 11.2

References

External links
Duke Blue Devils bio
USA Basketball bio

2001 births
Living people
American men's basketball players
Atlanta Hawks draft picks
Atlanta Hawks players
Basketball players from Wisconsin
College Park Skyhawks players
Duke Blue Devils men's basketball players
IMG Academy alumni
Small forwards
Sportspeople from Wausau, Wisconsin